Türksat 6A is a Turkish communications satellite under construction, which will be developed and produced indigenously to be operated by Türksat A.Ş. This satellite will be Turkey's first fully domestically produced communications satellite, and is expected to be launched in early 2023. Recommendation: to 010°w, maritimen lines.

History 
According to an agreement signed on 15 December 2014, the satellite will be developed and manufactured indigenously by specialists under the leadership of TÜBİTAK Space Technologies Research Institute (TÜBİTAK Uzay) in cooperation with Turkish Aerospace Industries (TAI), ASELSAN and CTech Bilişim Teknolojileri A.Ş. TAI will be in charge of design and production of the satellite structure and the subsystems such as spacecraft thermal control, chemical propulsion, harness and mechanical ground equipment needed to support the mission. TAI and TÜBİTAK Uzay will cooperate for the development of the software for satellite on-board data handling as well as for satellite command and control. They will perform the assembly, integration and test activities together at the TAI's Satellite Assembly Integration and Test Facility (UMET) in Akıncı, Ankara. Türksat 6A will also have X-band satellite communication capability for use by the Turkish Armed Forces.

The launch of the satellite is planned for early 2023. It will be in a geosynchronous orbit positioned at 42° East with an expected on-orbit life time of at least 15 years. It will consist of 16 Ku-band transponders, additionally 4 in reserve as well as two active and one in reserve X-band transponders. The Ku-band transponders will have a bandwidth of 7.3-18.1 GHz for uplink and 11.7-12.75 GHz downlink bandwidth. Each of the Ku-band transponders will have a minimum power of 140 watts and the X-band transponders at least 150 watts each.

While the X-band transponders will cover the territory of Turkey only, the Ku-band transponders of Türksat 6A will have three coverage zones:
 Turkey,
 "West Zone" covering the British Isles in the west, Scandinavian countries in the north, North Africa in the south, Caspian Sea in the east, 
 "East Zone" covering Anatolia in the west, Russian Federation in the north, Saudi Arabia and Pakistan in the south, China national boundary in the east.

It is estimated that the project will cost about US$250 million.

See also 

 Türksat (satellite)

References

External links 

Communications satellites of Turkey
Military satellites
Communications satellites in geostationary orbit
2023 in spaceflight
2023 in Turkey
Proposed satellites